Theo Welschen is a former Swiss curler.

At the national level, he is a four-time Swiss men's champion curler (1951, 1960, 1961, 1965), and all four times team line-up was the same.

Teams

References

External links
 

Living people
People from Zermatt
Swiss male curlers
Swiss curling champions
20th-century Swiss people
Year of birth missing (living people)
Place of birth missing (living people)